Surf is a browser game developed by Microsoft that is shipped with the Microsoft Edge web browser. In the game, the player must control a surfer as they move across a body of water while also collecting power-ups and evading obstacles and a kraken. The game features three game modes (classic, time trial, and slalom), has character customization, and supports keyboard, mouse, touch and gamepad controls.

Like Google Chrome's Dinosaur Game, Surf is accessible from the browser's offline error page and can also be accessed by entering edge://surf into the Edge address bar. Its gameplay has been frequently compared to the 1991 video game SkiFree. Microsoft also hosts a version of the game with limited features that is playable from any modern web browser. The game is also included with the Android and iOS versions of Edge. Users can also play the game while waiting for Windows 11 setup to finish.

In 2021, the game was updated with seasonal theming that changed the surfer to a skier on a snowy mountain as an homage to SkiFree. The kraken normally in the game was also replaced by the Abominable Snowman, also from SkiFree.

See also
SkiFree
Dinosaur Game
List of Easter eggs in Microsoft products

References

External links

Casual games
Browser games
2020 video games
Microsoft games
Single-player video games
Kraken in popular culture
Yeti in fiction
Freeware games
Surfing video games
Skiing video games
Video games developed in the United States
Retro-style video games